Nether Edge Amateurs F.C. was an English association football club from Sheffield, South Yorkshire. The club competed in the FA Amateur Cup between 1908 and 1934, and won the Sheffield & Hallamshire Junior Cup in  1915 and 1923

References

Defunct football clubs in England
Defunct football clubs in South Yorkshire
Sheffield Amateur League